The Bighorn Mountains are a mountain range of the Mojave Desert and Transverse Ranges, located in San Bernardino County, California. They are primarily within a Bureau of Land Management (BLM) protected area.

Geography
They are an eastern subrange of the San Bernardino Mountains. The Bighorn Mountains are located north of the Morongo Valley, northwest of Yucca Valley, directly south of the Johnson Valley, and southeast of the Lucerne Valley.

They support an ecotone or ecological transition zone, that including Yuccas and Joshua trees on the desert floor and stands of Jeffrey Pine at higher elevations.

Bighorn Mountain Wilderness Area
The  Bighorn Mountain Wilderness Area protects the north−central (BLM) and western areas of the range (San Bernardino National Forest).

A section of the eastern Bighorn Mountains is protected within Sand to Snow National Monument.

See also

References

External links
BLM California: official Bighorn Mountain Wilderness Area website
 BLM California: Bighorn Mountain Wilderness Area Brochure — with map.

Mountain ranges of San Bernardino County, California
Mountain ranges of the Mojave Desert
San Bernardino Mountains
Transverse Ranges
Wilderness areas of California
Bureau of Land Management areas in California
Protected areas of San Bernardino County, California
San Bernardino National Forest
Sand to Snow National Monument
Mountain ranges of Southern California